Qvale Island (in older sources Onale Island) is one of the Rønnbeck Islands in the Svalbard archipelago. It lies northeast of Cape Weyprecht on Spitsbergen. The wildlife consists largely of polar bears.

The island is named after Per Pedersen Qvale (a.k.a. Kvale, 1822–1912), a Norwegian seal hunter born in Kinsarvik.

References

Islands of Svalbard
Seal hunting